Gnorismoneura vallifica is a species of moth of the family Tortricidae. It is found in Japan and in China's Zhejiang province.

Its wingspan is 16–20 mm.

References

Moths described in 1935
Archipini